Aboubakr Bensaihi (born 1996), is a Belgian actor and singer of Moroccan descent. He is best known for starring as Marwan in the critically acclaimed 2015 film Black.

Early life
He was born in 1996 in and raised in Molenbeek. He completed Dutch-language education at the Imelda Institute.

Career
In 2014, Bensaihi was selected for the film Black by the directors Adil El Arbi and Bilall Fallah. Then, he played the lead male character 'Marwan' in the film Black. The film gained positive acclaim and screened at several international film festivals. He was later nominated at the Ensor Best Debut Award at Ostend Film Festival in 2016 and the Best Actor Award at Magritte Awards in 2017. With the success of the film, he joined the soap opera Thuis as 'Junes Bakkal' in 2017. In 2018, he joined the television serial Daidj.

Apart from acting, Bensaihi is also a singer and rapper. He himself sang the song Do You Hear Me for the soundtrack of Black. He also wrote the songs under the stage name 'Bakr'. His debut single was Sac à dos which was followed by successful single Elle a. Then he released the song Tomber dans ton love. In 2016, Bensaihi became one of the 10 laureates of Molenbekenaar of the year.

Filmography

See also
 7th Magritte Awards

References

External links
 

Living people
Belgian film actors
Belgian television actors
21st-century Belgian male singers
21st-century Belgian singers
1996 births
Belgian rappers